"Down by the Lazy River" is a song written by Alan and Merrill Osmond and performed by The Osmonds, it was produced by Alan Osmond and Michael Lloyd 
"Down By the Lazy River" was released on January 15, 1972 and appeared on the band's 1972 album, Phase III. It was certified Gold by the RIAA on March 24, 1972. In 2021, the song was featured in the South Park episode "South ParQ Vaccination Special".

Chart performance

Weekly charts
It reached No. 4 on the Billboard Hot 100 on March 4, 1972, and spent two weeks at No. 3 on the Cash Box Top 100. It also reached No. 40 on the UK Singles Chart in 1972.  The song reached No. 1 for two weeks in both the Netherlands and Canada.

Year-end charts

The song was ranked No. 36 on Billboard magazine's Top Hot 100 songs of 1972.  Cash Box had it at No. 30 for the year. The song, like almost all of the Osmonds' discography, was largely left out of recurrent rotation as radio stations no longer play the record; of all of the Osmonds' songs, "Down by the Lazy River" fared the worst relative to its popularity at the time.

Certifications

Cover versions
 1973 - The Barron Knights, on the album Barron Knights
 1974 - Society of Seven
 2002 - Montezuma's Revenge
 2002 - Wonderboy, on the compilation album Right to Chews - Bubblegum Classics Revisited
 2007 - Rytterne Röj, a Swedish band

References

1971 songs
1972 singles
Songs about rivers
The Osmonds songs
RPM Top Singles number-one singles
MGM Records singles
Songs written by Alan Osmond
Songs written by Merrill Osmond
Songs written by Wayne Osmond
Song recordings produced by Michael Lloyd